Longcanoe Lake is a narrow lake in Thunder Bay District, Ontario, Canada about  north-east of the community of Rossport and  north of Highway 17. The lake is part of the Whitesand River system and flows out at its south end via this river into Hornblende Lake, and eventually via the Hewitson River into Lake Superior. A mine access road travels along the eastern shore of the lake.

References

Lakes of Thunder Bay District